Philodoria urerana is a moth of the family Gracillariidae. It was first described by Otto Swezey in 1915. It is endemic to the Hawaiian islands of Oahu and Hawaii.

The larvae feed on Urera sandwicensis. They mine the leaves of their host plant. The mine starts as a very slender corridor, gradually widening as the larva grows and becoming serpentine and towards the last enlarges to a blotch. The larva emerges to spin a whitish cocoon on the surface of the leaf.

The pupal period lasts about 10 days.

External links

Philodoria
Endemic moths of Hawaii